Adrin Nazarian (born March 19, 1973) is an American politician of Armenian descent who served in the California State Assembly until 2022. A Democrat, he represented the 46th Assembly District which encompasses the central-southern San Fernando Valley.

He is of Armenian descent and Chair of the California Armenian Legislative Caucus and a member of the California Legislative Jewish Caucus.

Biography
Adrin Nazarian was born in Iran. As a child, he immigrated with his family to the San Fernando Valley in Southern California. He grew up there and received his BA degree in Economics from UCLA in 1996.

After graduating UCLA, Nazarian participated in the Coro Fellowship in Public Affairs. From 1997 to 1999, he served as an aide to Congressman Brad Sherman (D-CA), assisting him with business and labor community issues. In 1999, then-Governor Gray Davis appointed Nazarian as Special Assistant to the California Trade and Commerce Agency. During his tenure at the agency, Nazarian helped establish the Division of Science, Technology and Innovation, which focused on creating and maintaining technology-based jobs in California.

Nazarian served as chief of staff to then-Assemblymember Paul Krekorian from 2006 until Krekorian was elected to the Los Angeles City Council in 2010. Nazrian then served as Krekorian's chief of staff at City Hall until 2012.

In February 2022, Nazarian announced that he would not seek reelection in the 2022 California State Assembly election, and also announced that he intends to run in 2024 to replace Los Angeles City Councilmember Paul Krekorian, who cannot seek another term due to term limits.

Nazarian has served on the boards of several community-based organizations including the East Valley YMCA and the YWCA. He was one of the founding members of Generation Next Mentorship program which worked with local public schools to give young people alternatives to a life of gangs and drugs.

Nazarian and his wife, Diana, reside in Sherman Oaks with their children Alex, David and Maggie.

Political positions

Affirmative action 

Assembly Bill 979, enacted as law in 2020, requires publicly held domestic or foreign corporations whose principal executive office is in California to have a certain minimum numbers of directors from “underrepresented communities” in order to increase diversity on their boards. The term "underrepresented community" is defined as "an individual who self‑identifies as Black, African American, Hispanic, Latino, Asian, Pacific Islander, Native American, Native Hawaiian, or Alaska Native, or who self‑identifies as gay, lesbian, bisexual, or transgender." In 2022, Nazarian attempted, through Assembly Bill 1840, to add Armenians, Assyrians, Greeks, Jews, Muslims, Sikhs and individuals with disabilities, to the list of underrepresented groups.

Armenia and Artsakh 
In response to the Second Nagorno-Karabakh War, Nazarian stated "The United States and other world powers cannot continue to ignore these crimes against the Armenian people. While western global leaders ask for “peace” Turkey has provided arms and even transported Syrian mercenaries to Azerbaijan to fight with Aliyev’s army. Armenia is a thriving democracy, growing stronger each year. We know who the aggressors are and it is time that the international community acknowledges their complicity in these attacks. It's time the Western powers stopped prioritizing a few cheap barrels of oil over human life and peace."

In response to news coverage of the war, Nazarian called upon journalists to present the facts truthfully and in their entirety, stating "It’s your responsibility to make sure that people have a historical context and understand what is going on."

In response to the ongoing destruction of Armenian cultural and historical sites, Nazarian introduced a cultural heritage preservation bill (Assembly Bill 1815), which "would prohibit a museum in California that receives public funding from displaying any country-funded item or artifact, or sending to a country or receiving from a country any item or artifact, if that country has received an adverse judgment by the International Court of Justice regarding its destruction of cultural heritage artifacts or sites."

LGBTQ+ Rights 
In 2021, Nazarian introduced Assembly Bill 465, which requires that professional fiduciaries receive LGBTQ+ cultural competency and sensitivity training during their education and licensing process.

Nazarian hosted an October 2022 fundraiser brunch for GALAS LGBTQ+ Armenian Society, where the organization and its members received awards and recognition from local elected officials, including Los Angeles County Supervisors Kathryn Barger and Hilda Solis and Los Angeles City Councilmember Paul Krekorian.

Political career

California State Assembly 2012

The Campaign
The primary election was held on June 5, 2012, where Nazarian placed in first with 27.5% of the vote defeating a crowded field of 6 candidates; Andrew Lachman (D), Adriano Lecaros (D), Brian Johnson (D), Laurette Healey (D), and Jay Stern (R).

On November 6, 2012, Nazarian handily won over his opponent Jay Stern (R) with the support of 71% of the voting electorate.

Assemblymember representing the 46th district

On December 3, 2012, Adrin Nazarian was inaugurated into the California State Assembly, representing the 46th district, encompassing the central-southern San Fernando Valley in Los Angeles. He is a member of the Assembly Committees on Budget, Education, Health, Rules, and Transportation. Assemblymember Nazarian also sits on the State Allocation Board.

Legislation 2013-2014

AB 286 Film Industry Tax Credit
AB 320 Tobacco-Free Policy
AB 422 School Lunch Health Notice
AB 442 Minimum Wage
AB 501 New Car Dealers Clean-Up
AB 505 Language Access Standards
AB 580 Funding for Arts
AB 612 Traffic Lights
AB 617 Exchange/Medi-Cal Notice & Appeal Procedures
AB 649 Fracking Moratorium
AB 650 NGS Program
AB 850 JPA Rate Reduction Bonds
AB 1189 Film Industry Tax Credit
ACR 28 Armed Forces Day

California State Assembly 2014

California State Assembly 2016

California State Assembly 2018

California State Assembly 2020

In June 2021, Nazarian announced $11 million in state funding for three arts and educational institutions: $1 million to the USC Institute of Armenian Studies, $1 million to the Lark Musical Society, and $9 million to establish a Tumo Center for Creative Technologies location in the southeast San Fernando Valley.

Electoral history

2012

2014

2016

2018

References

External links 

  — California's 46th State Assembly district: Adrin Nazarian
 
 Campaign website — then-candidate Adrin Nazarian
 Join California Adrin Nazarian

Democratic Party members of the California State Assembly
Living people
University of California, Los Angeles alumni
Ethnic Armenian politicians
People from Sherman Oaks, Los Angeles
1973 births
American people of Armenian descent
21st-century American politicians
American politicians of Iranian descent
People from Tehran
Iranian emigrants to the United States
Iranian people of Armenian descent